The U.S. Post Office and Customs House-Douglas Main, also known as Douglas Post Office and Customs House or Douglas Main Post Office, is a Beaux-Arts building in Douglas, Arizona that was designed in 1912 and built in 1915.  The building provided spaces for a post office, a custom house and Federal offices.

It was listed on the National Register of Historic Places (NRHP) in 1985.  The NRHP nomination reports that the building is the most important example of Neo-Classical design in Douglas, and that the town's obtaining this as its first Federal building was important to the city.  The securing of funding for the building, its site selection, and its completion were major local events.

It is a contributing building in the Douglas Historic District.

See also 
List of United States post offices

References 

Beaux-Arts architecture in Arizona
Government buildings completed in 1915
Buildings and structures in Cochise County, Arizona
Douglas
Custom houses in the United States
1915 establishments in Arizona
National Register of Historic Places in Cochise County, Arizona
Douglas, Arizona
Custom houses on the National Register of Historic Places
Government buildings on the National Register of Historic Places in Arizona